The horseman's pick was a weapon of Middle Eastern origin used by cavalry during the Middle Ages in Europe and the Middle East. This was a type of war hammer that had a very long spike on the reverse of the hammer head. Usually, this spike was slightly curved downwards, much like a miner's pickaxe. The term is sometimes used interchangeably with war hammer. A metal-made horseman's pick called "nadziak" was one of the main weapons of the famous Polish Winged Hussars. A weapon of late make, the horseman's pick was developed by the English and used by their heavy Billmen, a unit of heavy infantry. It was used with great success during the Hundred Years' War. A use of the horseman's pick was to tear men from their mounts.

The horseman's pick was often used as a means to penetrate thick plate armour or mail which the standard sword could not. However, a number of drawbacks limited the weapon's effectiveness. Its relative heaviness made it unwieldy and, thus, easily avoided. The injury caused by the weapon was also small and rarely immediately fatal. Additionally, if swung too hard, the weapon often became embedded in the victim or their armour, making retrieval difficult.

See also
 War hammer
 Shepherd's axe
 Obuch

Cavalry
Polearms